Ride for Your Life is a 1924 American silent Western film directed by Edward Sedgwick and featuring Hoot Gibson.

Plot
As described in a film magazine review, Bud Watkins is in love with Betsy Burke. However, she shows a preference for The Cocopah Kid, a reckless bandit. Gambler "Gentleman Jim" Slade cheats Bud out of his ranch. The Cocopah Kid dies suddenly. Bud, disguised as the bandit, has a variety of wild adventures. He defeats Slade's plot to obtain possession of the newly discovered gold diggings, rescues Betsy from Slade's clutches, and eventually wins Betsy's affection.

Cast

Preservation
With no prints of Ride for Your Life located in any film archives, it is a lost film.

See also
 Hoot Gibson filmography

References

External links

 
 

1924 films
1924 lost films
1924 Western (genre) films
American black-and-white films
Films directed by Edward Sedgwick
Lost Western (genre) films
Lost American films
Films based on works by Johnston McCulley
Silent American Western (genre) films
Universal Pictures films
1920s American films
Films with screenplays by Richard Schayer